Abdrakhmanova is a rural locality (a village) in Grivenskoye Rural Settlement of Nyazepetrovsky District, Chelyabinsk Oblast, Russia. The population was 7 as of 2010. There is 1 street.

Geography 
The village is located on the left bank of the Karsanak River, 52 km southeast of Nyazepetrovsk (the district's administrative centre) by road. Ufimka is the nearest rural locality.

References 

Rural localities in Chelyabinsk Oblast